The Deanery of Cornwall is a Roman Catholic deanery within the Diocese of Plymouth. It consists of parishes in Cornwall with the addition of one parish in Devon.

Parishes

 
The parishes in the Deanery of Cornwall within the Diocese of Plymouth are:
 Bodmin : St Mary and St. Petroc
 Bude : St Peter's 
 Callington : Our Lady of Victories
 Camborne : St John Baptist
 Culdrose: The Holy Redeemer
 Falmouth : St Mary Immaculate
 Gunnislake : St Joseph's
 Helston : St Mary's
 Hayle : St Joseph's
 Holsworthy (Devon) (at St Peter & St Paul)
 Isles of Scilly : Our Lady Star of the Sea
 Launceston : St Cuthbert Mayne
 Looe : Our Lady and St. Nicholas
 Looe : Sclerder Abbey
 Liskeard : Our Lady and St. Neot
 Mawnan Smith: St Edward the Confessor
 Mullion : St Michael the Archangel
 Newquay : The Most Holy Trinity
 Padstow : St Saviour and St. Petroc
 Penzance : The Immaculate Conception
 Perranporth : Christ the King
 Redruth : The Assumption
 St Agnes : Our Lady Star of the Sea
 St Austell : St Augustine of Hippo
 St Ives : Sacred Heart and St Ia
 St Mawes: Our Lady of the Sea and St Anthony
 St Mawgan in Pydar: Franciscan Monastery of SS. Joseph and Anne
 Saltash : Our Lady of the Angels
 Tintagel : St. Paul the Apostle
 Torpoint : Our Lady Star of the Sea, HMS Raleigh
 Torpoint : St Joan of Arc
 Truro : Our Lady of the Portal and St Piran
 Wadebridge : St Michael

External links
Roman Catholic Diocese of Plymouth site

Cornwall-related lists
Roman Catholic Deaneries in the Diocese of Plymouth
Christianity in Cornwall